State Route 14 (SR 14) is a major east-to-west state highway in the U.S. state of Alabama. Spanning , the highway begins at the Mississippi state line at the terminus of Mississippi Highway 69 (MS 69) and connects the cities of Selma and Prattville before ending at SR 147 on the western side of Auburn.

History

SR 14 was one of the original routes in the Alabama's first statewide highway system in the 1920s. The original routing followed much of the same path as today, but was significantly shorter. The highway as built then started in Selma and traveled east along its current route to Auburn. As was standard for highways of the era, SR 14 was unpaved for its full length. The first paved section was constructed in 1932 between Elmore and Wetumpka. Paving continued sporadically for the next 15 years, with the last gravel section on the route being paved in 1947.

In 1956–57, the state renumbered many highways, and as a result other state highways to the northwest of Selma were renumbered as SR 14, extending the highway to the Mississippi state line along its modern course. In the 1960s, when the first segment of Interstate 85 (I-85) was constructed, bypassing Auburn and Opelika, SR 14 was extended from its eastern end at US 29 in Auburn along US 29 through Opelika to the northern end of that first Interstate Highway segment, at the current exit 64.  When US 280 was re-routed to meet I-85 between Auburn and Opelika in 1998, SR-14 was truncated to a new eastern endpoint at US 280 in Opelika. In 2009, it was further truncated to its present terminus at the junction with SR 147.

Local routings

 SR 14 is routed along Broad Street in Pickensville.
 SR 14 is routed along Columbus Road NW, 2nd Street NW, 1st Avenue, 3rd Street SE, and Dr. Martin Luther King Memorial Highway in Aliceville.
 SR 14 is routed along Mesopotamia Street, Eutaw Avenue, Main Street, Morrow Avenue, Boligee Street, and Greensboro Street in Eutaw.
 SR 14 is routed along Hobson Street and State Street in Greensboro.
 SR 14 is routed along West Greene Street, Washington Street, and Martin Luther King Parkway in Marion.
 SR 14 shares a route with US 80 for  through Selma.
 SR 14 is routed along Highland Avenue in Selma.
 SR 14 shares a route with US 82 for roughly five miles in Prattville.
 SR 14 is routed along I-65 in Prattville between Exits 179 and 181
 SR 14 is routed along Elmore Road, Coosa River Parkway, and Tallassee Highway in Wetumpka.
 SR 14 shares a route with SR 111 in Wetumpka.
 SR 14 is routed along Gilmer Avenue, Barnette Boulevard, Central Boulevard, Main Street, and Notasulga Road in Tallassee.
 SR 14 is routed along Tallapoosa Street and Auburn Road in Notasulga.

Major intersections

See also

References

014
Bypasses in Alabama
Transportation in Pickens County, Alabama
Transportation in Greene County, Alabama
Transportation in Hale County, Alabama
Transportation in Perry County, Alabama
Transportation in Dallas County, Alabama
Transportation in Autauga County, Alabama
Transportation in Elmore County, Alabama
Transportation in Tallapoosa County, Alabama
Transportation in Macon County, Alabama
Transportation in Lee County, Alabama
Buildings and structures in Selma, Alabama
Buildings and structures in Auburn, Alabama